Road signs in South Africa are based on the SADC-Road Traffic Sign Manual, a document designed to harmonise traffic signs in member states of the Southern Africa Development Community. Most of these signs were in the preceding South African RTSM.

A white background signifies the sign is permanent, while a yellow background signifies that the sign is temporary. Warning signs are an upwards-pointing red triangle and contain a black pictogram describing the danger or obstruction. Speed limit signs are a red circle with the limitation in black. South Africa drives on the left.

Permanent road signs

Regulatory signs

Control signs

Command signs

Prohibition signs

Reservation signs

Parking signs

Comprehensive signs

Selective restriction signs

De-restriction signs

Warning signs

Information signs

Combo signs

Temporary road signs

Regulatory signs

Command signs

Prohibition signs

Reservation signs

Parking signs

Comprehensive signs

Selective restriction signs

De-restriction signs

Warning signs

Information signs

Historic road signs
In 1993, South Africa began replacing the blue signs with a permanent white background, or a temporary yellow one was included. 

In 1977, the pre-RTSM manual signage was replaced by signs compliant with the RTSM manual released in 1970.

Regulatory signs

Control signs

Command signs

Prohibition signs

Warning signs

Guidance signs

Information signs

External links 
An extract from the New Official K53 manual for learner- and driving license tests

Road signs by country
Roads in South Africa
Road transport in South Africa
Transport in South Africa